Low Head is a rural residential locality in the local government area (LGA) of George Town in the Launceston LGA region of Tasmania. The 2016 census recorded a population of 572 for the state suburb of Low Head.
It is a suburb of George Town, on a peninsula at the mouth of the Tamar River.

It is a popular snorkel and scuba diving area during much of the year, with extensive wide, unspoiled beaches.

The area also has a lighthouse, beaches and a colony of little penguins (Eudyptula minor). 

The foghorn, a Chance Brothers "Type G" diaphone at Low Head Lighthouse, is the only operable foghorn of its type and is popular with tourists as it is sounded at noon every Sunday.

History
Low Head was gazetted as a locality in 1967.
The first Low Head Post Office opened on 12 September 1887 and closed in 1894.
In 1996 the  ran aground on Hebe Reef, off Low Head, causing the worst oil disaster in Australia's history.

Geography
The waters of the Tamar River estuary (also known as Port Dalrymple) and Bass Strait form the western to north-eastern boundaries. The George Town Aerodrome is within the locality.

Climate
Low Head has a temperate oceanic climate (Köppen: Cfb), bordering on a warm Mediterranean climate.

Road infrastructure 
Route A8 (Low Head Road) runs through from south-west to north-west, where it terminates.

See also
Wesele Cove

References

External links
 Iron Baron - report on oil spill
Low Head Pilot Station Maritime Museum - Maritime History of the area.

Towns in Tasmania
Tamar River
Bass Strait
Localities of George Town Council